The Chaya is a left tributary of the Ob river in Russia.

Course 
It flows in a roughly northern or northeastern direction along its course. Finally it meets the left bank of the Ob  from the Ob's mouth. The basin of the river is located in the Chainsky and Kolpashevsky districts of Tomsk Oblast.

Tributaries  

See also
List of rivers of Russia

References 

Rivers of Tomsk Oblast